Tigers (initially titled White Lies) is a 2014 Indian drama film directed by Danis Tanović, and produced as a joint production between Cinema Time, French production company ASAP Films and Sikhya Entertainment.

The film is inspired by an episode in Pakistan during the 1990s, a repetition of the Nestlé baby milk scandal in 1970s that occurred in developing countries. A Pakistani salesman named Syed Aamir Raza Hussain became a whistle-blower against his former employer Nestlé; in 1999, two years after he left Nestlé, Hussain released a report in association with the non-profit organisation International Baby Food Action Network, in which he alleged that Nestlé was encouraging doctors to push its infant formula products over breastfeeding.

The film features Emraan Hashmi in the leading role as Ayan, based on Hussain, a pharmaceutical representative in Pakistan who discovers his new company's baby formula has killed hundreds of children, after which he begins a lone and dangerous battle against the company. The film began filming in 2013 in Punjab, India, and had its premiere in September 2014 at the 2014 Toronto International Film Festival.

The film faced multiple delays during its initial release. After Tanovic decided to fictionalise Raza's battle, he renamed Nestlé as Lasta in the film and cast Hashmi after watching Shanghai (2012). Tigers was publicly released on the streaming platform ZEE5 on 21 November 2018.

Cast 
 Emraan Hashmi as Ayan 
 Geetanjali Thapa as Zainab, Ayan's wife
 Danny Huston as Alex
 Khalid Abdalla as Nadeem
 Adil Hussain as Bilal, Ayan's boss
 Maryam d'Abo as Maggie 
 Satyadeep Mishra as Dr. Faiz
 Heino Ferch as Robert
 Sam Reid as Frank
 Supriya Pathak as Taslima, Ayan's mother
 Vinod Nagpal as Mustafa, Ayan's father
Ashwath Bhatt as Dr Saleem
 Rubina as Nurse
 Benjamin Gilani as Col Malik
 Inayat Sood as Nurse 1
 Kanwal Baidwan as Nurse
 Milind Raja as Nader
 Sanjay Panchal as Sanjay

See also 
 Nestlé Pakistan

References

External links 
 
 

2014 films
Indian films based on actual events
Films shot in Punjab, India
Films set in Pakistan
Films directed by Danis Tanović
2010s Hindi-language films
Pharmaceutical industry
2010s Urdu-language films
Films featuring songs by Pritam
ZEE5 original films
2014 direct-to-video films
Nestlé
Films set in 1994
Films set in London
Films set in Germany
Films shot in London
Films shot in Germany